Colorado Time Systems (CTS) is an American company based in Loveland, Colorado that designs, manufactures, sells, and services aquatic timing systems, scoreboards, LED video displays, and related products.

History
Colorado Time Systems was born in the Test & Measurement division of Hewlett-Packard (HP). HP wanted to explore opportunities in the sports timing industry and chose aquatics because it required such precise measurement. In 1972, a group of HP engineers spun off from HP and founded CTS. From those very specific aquatic beginnings, an extensive and multi-faced sports timing and display company was born. Throughout the years, CTS has maintained a steadfast commitment to provide cutting edge scoring and display products for all venues. In July 2011, Colorado Time Systems was acquired by PlayCore; based in Chattanooga, TN.  Colorado Time Systems is part of the Everactive Brands division.

Sponsorship partners 

Colorado Time Systems is the official timing, scoring and display partner to:  USA Water Polo, US Synchronized Swimming, Mexican Swimming Federation, FINA Junior World Swimming Championship, American Swimming Coaches Association, and China Swimming Association.

Important Mentions

Modern Marvels - History Channel 
On December 23, 2008, the History Channel series, Modern Marvels, aired an episode titled "Measure It!".  This episode discussed various modern methods of precise measurement, including the measurement of time, following the Beijing Olympics. The segment, featuring Colorado Time Systems, talked about the construction of modern timing systems and the history of Swimming Touchpads.

Photo Gallery

See also on Wikipédia
Aquatic timing system
Scoreboards
Swimming Touchpads

Footnotes

External links
Colorado Time Systems Website
Swiss Timing Website
Daktronics Aquatics Website
Seiko Time Systems Website
Display technology companies
Water sports equipment manufacturers